Oblivsky is a rural locality (a khutor) in Kumylzhenskoye Rural Settlement, Kumylzhensky District, Volgograd Oblast, Russia. The population was 293 as of 2010. There are 9 streets.

Geography 
Oblivsky is located in forest steppe, on Khopyorsko-Buzulukskaya Plain, 4 km north of Kumylzhenskaya (the district's administrative centre) by road. Kumylzhenskaya is the nearest rural locality.

References 

Rural localities in Kumylzhensky District